ADP-ribosylation factor-like protein 6-interacting protein 1 is a protein that in humans is encoded by the ARL6IP1 gene.

References

External links

Further reading